The 2012 Grand Prix Cycliste de Québec was the third edition of the Grand Prix Cycliste de Québec, a single-day professional bicycle road race. It was the 25th event of the 2012 UCI World Tour season. The race is one of the only two events which are part of the World Tour calendar in North America, the other one being the Grand Prix Cycliste de Montreal contested two days later.

In a two-up sprint finish, Australian national champion Simon Gerrans of the  team won the race, after following an attack by 's Greg Van Avermaet in the closing stages of the race, with the two riders working together to get clear and Gerrans prevailed on the uphill finish on the Grande-Allée. Van Avermaet was second, while the peloton was led home by the 2011 Grand Prix Cycliste de Montreal winner Rui Costa, four seconds in arrears.

Course

The race consisted of 16 laps of a circuit  in length, with exactly the same course as the 2011 edition. The circuit was well-suited for climbers and puncheurs, since the finish was situated on an uphill climb, located on the Grande-Allée street, in the heart of Old Québec and the course featured steep climbs. The final stretch was a wide, straight line with a regular 4% gradient. The major difficulties were:
Kilometre 9: Côte de la Montagne:  with an average gradient of 10%, with a pass of  metres at 13%
Kilometre 10: Côte de la Potasse:  with an average gradient of 9%
Kilometre 11: Côte de la Fabrique:  with an average gradient of 7%
Kilometre 11: Climb to the finish line:  with an average gradient of 4%

It is worth noting that the Côte Gilmour descent included a technical passage, 2 successive left bends of 90 degrees each, the first of which was negotiated while the descending slope had a gradient of more than 10%.

Teams
As the Grand Prix Cycliste de Québec was a UCI World Tour event, all 18 UCI ProTeams were invited automatically and obligated to send a squad. There were also three wildcard invitations, which were UCI Professional Continental teams: two French squads ( and ) and a Canadian one. A Canadian national squad also competed in the race, and as such, formed the event's 22-team peloton.

The 22 teams that competed in the race were:

Canada (national team)

Race summary

The start was given by the mayor of Quebec City, Régis Labeaume, and the former French Prime Minister Alain Juppé. During the second lap of the 16 laps race, eight men went clear of the peloton, they were soon joined by a sizable number of riders and were brought back  into the race. On lap 4, another escape group formed, initiated by Thomas Rohregger, who was chased by Vladimir Gusev, both men had been part of an earlier breakaway. The group ballooned to eight riders when the chasing group made contact, and the escapees sailed to a maximum lead of 6' 10". With six laps remaining,  and  took the lead of the bunch and worked to bring the dangerous break back, which they ultimately did with only two laps to go, on the steep Côte de la Montagne.

Soon thereafter, 's Chris Anker Sørensen and Canadian national team member Bruno Langlois tried their luck and built a small 20 seconds gap by the start of the penultimate lap. Langlois was ultimately dropped and replaced by Dries Devenyns near the finish line as the bell sounded the last lap. Greg Van Avermaet attacked in the Côte de la Montagne, soon followed by Simon Gerrans. While the surging chase group was on their heels, Gerrans out sprinted the Belgian Van Avermaet to take the victory.

Quebecer François Parisien of  survived a fall in the first lap of the race to finish in tenth position, the best placed Canadian of the race only 4 seconds in arrears of Gerrans, while Bruno Langlois won the King of the Mountains classification and took 30th place. Pre-race favourite Ryder Hesjedal had a difficult day, finishing with a 5' 18" deficit. Gerrans stated after the race: "This is some of the hardest racing on the calendar. It's fantastic racing in Québec on an exciting circuit with great crowds and great ambience."

Results

References

External links
 

2012
2012 UCI World Tour
Grand Prix Cycliste de Quebec
Grand Prix Cycliste
September 2012 sports events in Canada